Zungri is a comune and town in Calabria, in southern Italy, in the province of Vibo Valentia.

References

Cities and towns in Calabria